Magni Wentzel (born 28 June 1945 in Oslo, Norway) is a Norwegian jazz musician (vocals and guitar), the daughter of musicians Odd Wentzel-Larsen and Åse Wentzel, and known for a number of jazz recordings.

Career 
Wentzel started in "Totenlaget Barneteater" (1951). She was trained by opera singers Erna Skaug, Almar Heggen and professor Paul Lohmann in Wiesbaden, took guitar lessons from 1956, and released her debut jazz album That Old Feeling in 1959. Instead of attending the first year of the newly established "Statens operahøgskole" in Oslo, she chose to go on learning classical guitar in Spain (1963), Switzerland and England, and taught jazz song under Tete Montoliu.  
She played on the Club 7 in Oslo within Geir Wentzel Band, and at the same time she was strongly influenced by Aretha Franklin.
 
She collaborated extensively with a series of Oslo-based musicians, like within the quartets and quintets including Einar Iversen and Egil Kapstad.
Peter Gullin dedicated the album Far, Far Away Where Longing Live to her. Later she worked for Opera Mobile, then as the "mother" in  The Tales of Hoffmann by Offenbach.

Honors 
Gammleng-prisen 1988
Buddyprisen 1998

Discography

Solo albums 
1969: Magni Wentzel Plays (Polydor), Norwegian versions of pop songs Frank Mills and Starshine from the musical Hair
1975: Guitar And Flute (Polydor), classic classics with Torkil Bye Flute
1978: Jeg Synger For Min Lille Venn (VNP), children's album with her mother Åse Wentzel
1983: Sofies Plass (Hot Club Records), a famous jazz pieces with Egil Kapstad, Halvard Kausland, Ole Jacob Hansen & Carl Morten Iversen, nominated for the Spellemannprisen
1986: All Or Nothing at All (Gemini Records), with Egil Kapstad, Terje Venaas & Egil Johansen
1988: My Wonderful One (Gemini Records), classics with Art Farmer, Egil Kapstad, Terje Venaas & Egil Johansen
1991: New York Nights (Gemini Records), jazz hits with Red Mitchell & Roger Kellaway
1995: Come Away With Me (Gemini Records),jazz standards, with Niels-Henning Ørsted Pedersen & Roger Kellaway
1997: Turn Out The Stars (Hot Club Records), varied wipers, among them four from West Side Story, with Roger Kellaway & Mads Vinding
2000: Porgy & Bess (Hot Club Records), music by George Gershwin with her own sextet (including Olga Konkova, Nils Jansen, Christian Jaksjø, Carl Morten Iversen & Espen Rud)
2002: Divergence (Hot Club Records), jazz and Spanish guitar music recorded 1997, with Mads Vinding & Roger Kellaway
2010: Live (Curling Legs), recordings from the club Håndverkeren by NRK, at "Oslo Jazzfestival" 2003, with Jørn Øien, Jon Gordon, Carl Morten Iversen & Espen Rud

Singles 
1958: Mamma (En Gutt Har Sett På Meg), with Per Nyhaugs orkester
1958: Byssan lull Blues, with Åse Wentzel
1959: That Old Feeling/My One And Only Love
1959: Augustin, with Åse Wentzel & Willy Andresens orkester
1960: Milk Shake/Troll-Rock
1970: Walk on My Side/I Want You

Collaborative works 
With other projects
1994: Stille Vann, with Torhild Nigar
2004: Syng & le – de beste fra 1952–1962, with Åse Wentzel
2005: Portrait of a Norwegian Jazz Artist with Erik Amundsen

With various artists
1988: The Jazz Sampler
1992: Fra En Musikers Dagbok
1997: Gemini – The Jazz Sampler Vol. 3
2003: Turning Pages – Jazz in Norway Vol. 4
2005 Stellar Voyage – Rare Rock Grooves And Fusion From Norway
2005 Turning Pages: Jazz In Norway 1960–70
2006 Hørt & Uhørt – 28 Diamanter Fra 50-tallet
2006 Jazz Collection 1
2007 NRK Sessions: Soul, Afro-Jazz And Latin From The Club 7 Scene

References

External links 

"That Old Feeling" sung by Magni Wentzel, Oslo 1959. Audio only on YouTube

Norwegian women jazz singers
Norwegian jazz guitarists
Norwegian jazz composers
1945 births
Living people
Musicians from Oslo
Hot Club Records artists
Gemini Records artists
Ponca Jazz Records artists
20th-century guitarists
21st-century Norwegian guitarists
20th-century Norwegian women singers
20th-century Norwegian singers
21st-century Norwegian women singers
21st-century Norwegian singers
20th-century women guitarists
21st-century women guitarists